Alucita baihua is a moth of the family Alucitidae. It is found in China.

References

Moths described in 1977
Alucitidae
Moths of Asia